Biancaneve is an Italian erotic comic book, created in 1972 by Renzo Barbieri and Rubino Ventura (pseudonym of Giuseppe Pederiali) and illustrated by Leone Frollo.

The series, published by Edifumetto, was based on Snow White and the Seven Dwarfs. However, it soon lost most of its connections with the original story. The series chronicles the sexual adventures of the title character in a world of magic and monsters. Biancaneve (Snow White) remains a virgin under attack during the first four issues of the series. After losing her virginity in volume 5, she becomes increasingly addicted to sex.

The comic has lasted for 94 issues, distributed in four series: #1-2, #1-12, #1-12, #1-68.

Alessandro Biffignandi painted all the covers for the series, claiming it was his favorite title to work on.

The comics inspired two films, La principessa sul pisello (1976), directed by Piero Regnoli and starring Susanna Martinková, and Biancaneve & Co (1982), directed by Mario Bianchi and featuring starlet Michela Miti with Oreste Lionello, Gianfranco D'Angelo and Aldo Sambrell. The latter was also released in English as Snow White and 7 Wise Men.

References

Further reading
 Luigi Bernardi (cured by). I quaderni del fumetto italiano. Le Monografie: Biancaneve. Paolo Ferriani Editore, 1986.
 Sex and Horror: The Art of Alessandro Biffignandi, Korero Press, 2016.

1972 comics debuts
1986 comics endings
Comics about women
Comics based on fairy tales
Comics set in the Middle Ages
Erotic comics
Fantasy comics
Female characters in comics
Italian comic strips
Italian comics adapted into films
Italian comics characters
Works based on Snow White
Sexual addiction in fiction